David O'Brien (born 28 January 1983) is a retired British swimmer, who specialized in freestyle events. He is a single-time Olympian (2004), a resident athlete of Team GB, and a member of Stirling Swimming Club, under head coach Chris Martin.

O'Brien qualified for the men's 4×200 m freestyle relay, as a member of the British team, at the 2004 Summer Olympics in Athens. He finished sixth in the 200 m freestyle from the Olympic trials in Sheffield, posting a relay entry time of 1:51.12. Teaming with Simon Burnett, Gavin Meadows, and Ross Davenport in the final, O'Brien swam a third leg and recorded a split of 1:49.05. He and the rest of the Brits missed the podium by 0.77 seconds behind the Italians, led by Massimiliano Rosolino, finishing fourth in a new national record of 7:12.60.

References

External links
Profile – British Amateur Swimming Federation

1983 births
Living people
English male freestyle swimmers
English people of Irish descent
Olympic swimmers of Great Britain
Swimmers at the 2004 Summer Olympics
Sportspeople from Prescot
World Aquatics Championships medalists in open water swimming